Jenna Roberts is a retired Australian ballet dancer, formerly a principal dancer with Birmingham Royal Ballet  (BRB)

Biography
Roberts was born in Newcastle, New South Wales, and trained at the Marie Walton-Mahon Dance Academy in Newcastle, Australia, and the Royal Ballet Upper School. Joining Birmingham Royal Ballet in 2003, she quickly rose through the company. In 2006 she starred as Juliet for the "Ballet Hoo!" project,  a collaboration between BRB, Channel 4, the charity Youth at Risk and local authorities. She suffered a setback after a severe injury in 2007, returning to achieve a promotion to company principal at the end of the 2011–12 season. Roberts has been acclaimed as a masterful Balanchine interpreter, credited for combining ethereal elegance with outstanding stamina to craft leading roles. After her younger sister Callie Roberts joined the company the two siblings performed together in works including Cinderella.

Roberts has recently created roles in a number of short ballets, working with the contemporary American choreographer Jessica Lang in Lyric Pieces, and dancing as the Fairy in Michael Corder's Le Baiser de la fée. In 2014 The Observer reported that an "incandescent Jenna Roberts steals the show" in Alexander Whitley's new ballet Kin.

Having retired from dancing, she now teaches Pilates, and she and husband Joseph Caley relocated to Australia in 2022, where Caley has become a principal artist with The Australian Ballet

General repertory

References

Living people
British ballerinas
Year of birth missing (living people)